Philadelphia, Here I Come! is a 1964 play by Irish dramatist Brian Friel. Set in the fictional town of Ballybeg, County Donegal, the play launched Friel onto the international stage.

Plot
Philadelphia, Here I Come! centres around Gareth (Gar) O'Donnell's move to America, specifically Philadelphia. The play takes place on the night before and morning of Gar's departure to America. Gar is portrayed by two characters, Gar Public ("the Gar that people see, talk to, talk about") and Gar Private ("the unseen man, the man within, the conscience"). Gareth lives with his father, S. B. O'Donnell ("a responsible, respectable citizen") with whom he has never connected. Gar works for his father in his shop and their relationship is no different from that of Boss and Employee. Private often makes fun of S.B. calling him "Screwballs" and parodying his nightly routine as a fashion show.

Essentially, this play is a tragicomedy. It contains many comical scenes, especially the scene with Lizzy Sweeney, Gar's aunt, in which Gar decides to go to America.  Despite the fact that Gar seems to have a relationship with his father no different from that of Boss and Employee, there are indications that there is love between them. In episode 1, Madge says "It must have been near daybreak when he (SB O'Donnell) got to sleep last night. I could hear the bed creaking."  Other indications that SB is secretly devastated by his son's imminent departure, include his remembrance of Gar in a sailor suit proudly declaring he need not go to school, he'll work in his father's shop – a memory of an event that may not have happened, and the scene when he pretends to read the paper, but fails to notice that it has been upside-down.

Gar's reasons for going to America (he wanted to prove to Aunt Lizzie that he was not "cold like the O'Donnells"), along with his secret love for his uncommunicative father, and their desperate final, pathetic attempts to communicate make this play quite tragic.

All of the action in this play takes place within a period of a few hours on the evening of Gar's departure, but it also includes flashbacks to Gar's relationship with local girl Kate Doogan, and the visit from his Aunt Lizzie.

Productions

The play was first staged at the Gaiety Theatre, Dublin on September 28, 1964. The production, directed by Hilton Edwards, transferred to Broadway in 1966, where it ran for 326 performances, and received several Tony Award nominations, including for Best Play and Best Director.

In 2004, the play was performed through the Association of Regional Theatres Northern Ireland, directed by Adrian Dunbar and produced by Andrea Montgomery.

Second Age Theatre Company staged the play in 2007, directed by Alan Stanford. This production toured Ireland, stopping off at Donegal, Ennis, Dublin and Cork, as well as New York, Texas and California in the USA.

In 2012 the play was staged at Donmar Warehouse Theatre in London.

Noel Pearson produced an acclaimed revival of the play at Dublin's Gaiety Theatre in March/April 2010.

Andrew Flynn directed the play at Lyric Theatre, Belfast in February/March 2014.

An amateur production of the play was to be staged by the Irish Theatre Group at the Warehouse Studio Theatre in Brussels, Belgium, 26–30 March 2019.

The play, like Friel's Dancing at Lughnasa, is on the syllabus for English Higher Level and Ordinary Level for the Irish Leaving Certificate examinations, as well as the English A1 course of the International Baccalaureate.

In November 2010 Second Age presented Dancing at Lughnasa at the Helix Theatre, Dublin City University.

In October 2021, Patrick Talbot Productions presented the play at Cork Opera House. The cast included Alex Murphy as Private Gar.

Characters
Below is a list of the characters from the play Philadelphia, Here I Come! along with a cast list from when it was first performed, at the Gaiety Theatre, Dublin, on September 28, 1964.

Film
The play was adapted for a film released in Ireland in 1970.  The adaptation was produced and directed by John Quested and stars Siobhán McKenna, Donal McCann, and Des Cave. Although it was apparently never released to theaters in the US, it is part of the American Film Theatre series of films, and was released to DVD in 2003 along with the other thirteen films.

References

External links
 
 

1964 plays
County Donegal in fiction
Irish-American culture in Philadelphia
Plays by Brian Friel
Plays set in Ireland